Sammy Mofokeng (born 5 August 1991) is a South African cricketer. He is a right-handed batsman and right-arm medium-fast bowler who plays for Northerns. He was born in Free State.

Mofokeng made his cricketing debut during the 2008–09 CSA Under-19 Competition, playing two matches in the competition in spite of making a golden duck in his first innings. He made his first-class debut during the 2009–10 season, against Border, scoring 6 not out in his debut innings.

In September 2018, he was named in Northerns' squad for the 2018 Africa T20 Cup.

References

External links
Sammy Mofokeng at Cricket Archive

South African cricketers
Northerns cricketers
1991 births
Living people
South Western Districts cricketers